Babel is a village in Carmarthenshire, Wales.

Villages in Carmarthenshire